Gladiolus 'Robinetta' is a cultivar of Gladiolus which features fiery red blooms with dainty white markings. Its eye-catching flowers (up to 7 per stem), are slightly fragrant and grow on loose spikes (2-3 spikes per corm) that are adorned by narrow, deep-green sword-shaped leaves.

See also 
 List of Gladiolus varieties

References
Jardins Sans Secret

Robinetta
Ornamental plant cultivars